The Bifertenstock is a mountain in the Glarus Alps, located at an elevation of  on the border between the cantons of Glarus (north) and Graubünden (south), its peak, however, is located about 25 metres south of the border. It overlooks four valleys: the valley of the Biferten Glacier to the north-west, the Griess Glacier to the north-east, the Val Punteglias to the south, which leads down to Trun, and the Val Frisal on the south-east. Glaciers cover both sides of the mountain, but are smaller on the southern side.

The mountain lies in the municipalities of Trun and Breil/Brigels, in the canton of Graubünden, and Glarus Süd, in the canton of Glarus. The nearest settlements are the villages of Trun, to the south, and Linthal, to the north.

References

External links

Bifertenstock on Summitpost

Mountains of the Alps
Alpine three-thousanders
Mountains of Switzerland
Mountains of the canton of Glarus
Mountains of Graubünden
Glarus–Graubünden border
Trun, Switzerland